Stephen John Fireovid (born June 6, 1957), is an American former professional baseball pitcher, who played in Major League Baseball (MLB) for the San Diego Padres, Philadelphia Phillies, Chicago White Sox, Seattle Mariners, and Texas Rangers, in all or part of six seasons, between  and . Never did Fireovid pitch in more than 10 games in any one MLB season.

Career
In 1977, he played collegiate summer baseball with the Falmouth Commodores of the Cape Cod Baseball League.

In , while pitching for the Montreal Expos’ Triple-A affiliate Indianapolis Indians, Fireovid composed a journal of his experiences. The journal was turned into a book, The 26th Man: One Minor League Pitcher's Pursuit of a Dream, in 1991. The book was co-authored by Mark Winegardner. Fireovid's career is also profiled with a chapter in the book Journeymen: 24 Bittersweet Tales of Short Major League Sports Careers, by Kurt Dusterberg.

Fireovid was initially married to Patty, with whom he has three children (Joseph, Samuel, and Thomas). Subsequently, he wed Michele and had two children (Adam and Rachel).

References

External links

1957 births
Living people
Amarillo Gold Sox players
American expatriate baseball players in Canada
Baseball players from Ohio
Buffalo Bisons (minor league) players
Calgary Cannons players
Chicago White Sox players
People from Bryan, Ohio
Falmouth Commodores players
Hawaii Islanders players
Indianapolis Indians players
Las Vegas Stars (baseball) players
Miami RedHawks baseball players
Major League Baseball pitchers
Omaha Royals players
Oklahoma City 89ers players
Philadelphia Phillies players
Portland Beavers players
Reno Silver Sox players
San Diego Padres players
Seattle Mariners players
Syracuse Chiefs players
Texas Rangers players
Walla Walla Padres players